Sweden has speed limits ranging from 30 km/h to 120 km/h (18 to 75 mph), where 30, 40, 50, 60 and 70 km/h are used within towns and cities. Outside schools and hospitals the limit is often 30 km/h. 70, 80, 90 and 100 km/h are mainly used outside built-up areas where the speed limit depends on the standard and safety of the road. 90 and 100 km/h are used mainly on roads with separated lanes, however local exceptions may apply, mainly in northern Sweden, where 100 km/h (62 mph) is legal on roads with no separated lanes and where the standard of the road often is poor. The main reason for setting 100 km/h on these roads is because of their high importance to the region. Earlier it was permitted to drive 110 km/h (68 mph) on these roads but due to the poor standards the speed limit was lowered to 100 km/h in 2008.

110 km/h and 120 km/h are the main speed limits on motorways.  120 km/h (75 mph) is only set on the best, safest and straightest motorways, usually the newest, which mostly are present in the southern parts of Sweden on the E4 and E6, in total about 300 km out of the 1500 total motorway km.  110 km/h is still the most common speed limit on motorways in Sweden.

Local exceptions to motorway speed limits may apply, mainly near cities and on inner-city motorways. One of the lowest speed limits on a Swedish inner-city motorway is 70 km/h (43 mph). This has been set on E4 Essingeleden through Stockholm. This is an 8-lane motorway passing near central parts of the capital. It is also present through Gothenburg. However this speed limit only applies on a short part of the motorways. The reason is the high risk of jams.

From about 1990 to 1995, Sweden lowered the limit on motorways in the large city provinces from 110 km/h to 90 km/h (56 mph), which was the lowest in Europe at the time (together with Norway), citing environmental reasons. The term "large city province" was defined as a province including one of the three large cities with suburbs. This meant that the west coast motorway E6 had a 90 km/h limit on its (then) about 250 km of motorway, but some ordinary roads in less densely populated provinces had a 110 km/h limit. This reduced limit was later removed because it was neither popular nor well obeyed.

The speed limits are signposted with signs with yellow background, and otherwise looking like those in other European countries. There are no "end of speed limit" signs, in contrast to most other countries in Europe. All speed limits are signposted with the actual speed limit value.

Max speed limits

References

Sweden
Road transport in Sweden
Driving in Sweden